Each "article" in this category is a collection of entries about several stamp issuers, presented in alphabetical order. The entries are formulated on the micro model and so provide summary information about all known issuers.  

See the :Category:Compendium of postage stamp issuers page for details of the project.

Macao
Refer 	Macau

Macau 
Dates 	1884 –
Capital 	Macau
Currency 	(1884) 1000 reis = 1 milreis
		(1894) 78 avos = 1 rupee
		(1913) 100 avos = 1 pataca

Macedonia 

Dates 	1991 –
Capital 	Skopje
Currency 	(1991) 100 paras = 1 dinar
		(1992) 100 deni (de.) = 1 dinar (d.)

Main Article Needed 

See also 	Yugoslavia

Macedonia (German Occupation) 

Dates 	1944 only
Currency 	100 stotinki = 1 lev

Refer 	German Occupation Issues (WW2)

See also 	Kavalla (Greek Occupation);
		Greek Occupation Issues

Madagascar & Dependencies 

Dates 	1896 – 1958
Capital 	Tananarive
Currency 	100 centimes = 1 franc

Main Article Needed 

Includes 	Anjouan;
		Diego–Suarez;
		Great Comoro;
		Mayotte;
		Moheli;
		Nossi–Be;
		Ste Marie de Madagascar

See also 	Malagasy Republic

Madagascar (British posts) 

Dates 	1884 – 1895
Currency 	12 pence = 1 shilling; 20 shillings = 1 pound

Refer 	Postage stamps and postal history of Madagascar

Madagascar (French Post Offices) 

Dates 	1885 – 1896
Currency 	100 centimes = 1 franc

Refer 	French Post Offices Abroad

See also 	French Colonies;
		Madagascar & Dependencies

Madeira 

Dates 	1868 –
Capital 	Funchal
Currency 	(1868) 1000 reis = 1 milreis
		(1929) 100 centavos = 1 escudo

Main Article Needed 

See also 	Africa (Portuguese Colonies);
		Funchal

Mafeking 

Dates 	1900 only
Currency 	12 pence = 1 shilling; 20 shillings = 1 pound

Refer 	Cape of Good Hope

Mafia Island (British Occupation) 

Dates 	1915 – 1916
Currency 	(GEA) 64 pesa = 100 heller = 1 rupee;
		(BEA) 100 cents = 1 rupee
		(both currencies in use simultaneously)

Refer 	British Occupation Issues

Magyarország 

Refer 	Hungary

Mahe 

Refer 	French Indian Settlements

Mahra Sultanate of Qishn & Socotra 

Dates 	1967 only
Capital 	Qishn
Currency 	1000 fils = 1 dinar

Refer 	Aden Protectorate States

Majunga (French Post Office) 

Dates 	1895 only
Currency 	100 centimes = 1 franc

Refer 	French Post Offices Abroad

Malacca 

Dates 	1948 –
Capital 	Melaka
Currency 	100 cents = 1 dollar

Main Article Needed 

See also 	Malaysia

Malagasy Republic 

Dates 	1958 –
Capital 	Tananarive
Currency 	(1958) 100 centimes = 1 franc
		(1976) 5 francs = 1 ariary

Main Article Needed 

See also 	Madagascar & Dependencies

Malawi 

Dates 	1964 –
Capital 	Zomba
Currency 	(1964) 12 pence = 1 shilling; 20 shillings = 1 pound
		(1970) 100 tambalas =  1 kwacha

Main Article Needed 

See also 	British Central Africa;
		Nyasaland Protectorate

Malaya 

Refer 	Federated Malay States;
		Malayan Federation;
		Malayan Postal Union;
		Malaysia

Malaya (British Military Administration) 

Dates 	1945 – 1948
Currency 	100 cents = 1 dollar

Refer 	BA/BMA Issues

Malaya (Japanese Occupation) 

Dates 	1942 – 1945
Currency 	100 cents = 1 dollar

Refer 	Japanese Occupation Issues

Malaya (Thai Occupation) 

Dates 	1943 – 1945
Currency 	100 cents = 1 dollar

Refer 	Thailand

Malayan Federation 

Dates 	1957 – 1963
Capital 	Kuala Lumpur
Currency 	100 cents = 1 dollar

Refer 	Malaysia

Malayan Postal Union 

Dates 	1936 – 1968
Currency 	100 cents = 1 dollar

Refer 	Malaysia

Malaysia 

Dates 	1963 –
Capital 	Kuala Lumpur
Currency 	100 cents = 1 dollar

Includes 	Malayan Federation;
		Malayan Postal Union

See also 	Federated Malay States;
		Johore;
		Kedah;
		Kelantan;
		Malacca;
		Negri Sembilan;
		Pahang;
		Penang;
		Perak;
		Perlis;
		Sabah;
		Sarawak;
		Selangor;
		Sungei Ujong;
		Trengganu

Maldive Islands 

Dates 	1906 –
Capital 	Malé
Currency 	(1906) 100 cents = 1 rupee
		(1951) 100 laaris = 1 rupee

Main Article Needed

Mali Federation 

Dates 	1959 – 1960
Capital 	Bamako
Currency 	100 centimes = 1 franc

Main Article Needed 

See also 	French West Africa;
		Mali Republic;
		Senegal

Mali Republic 

Dates 	1960 –
Capital 	Bamako
Currency 	100 centimes = 1 franc

Main Article Needed 

See also 	French West Africa;
		Mali Federation

Malta 

Dates 	1860 –
Capital 	Valletta
Currency 	(1860) 12 pence = 1 shilling; 20 shillings = 1 pound
		(1972) 10 mils = 1 cent; 100 cents = 1 pound
		(2008) 100 cents = 1 euro

Main Article Postage stamps and postal history of Malta

Malmedy 

Refer 	Eupen & Malmedy (Belgian Occupation)

Man 

Refer 	Isle of Man

Manama 

Refer 	Ajman

Manchukuo 

Dates 	1932 – 1945
Capital 	Harbin
Currency 	100 fen = 1 yuan

Main Article Needed

Manchuria 

Refer 	Chinese Provinces;
		CPR Regional Issues;
		Manchukuo

Mariana Islands (Marianen) 

Dates 	1899 – 1914
Capital 	Saipan
Currency 	100 pfennige = 1 mark

Refer 	German Colonies

See also 	Spanish Marianas

Marianas Espanolas 

Refer 	Spanish Marianas

Marianen 

Refer 	Mariana Islands

Marienwerder 

Dates 	1920 only
Currency 	100 pfennige = 1 mark

Refer 	Plebiscite Issues

Maroc 

Refer 	French Morocco

Marruecos 

Refer 	Spanish Morocco

Marschall–Inseln 

Refer 	Marshall Islands (German Colony)

Marshall Inseln 

Refer 	Marshall Islands (German Colony)

Marshall Islands 

Dates 	1984 –
Capital 	Majuro
Currency 	100 cents = 1 dollar

Main Article Needed

Marshall Islands (German Colony) 

Dates 	1897 – 1916
Capital 	Majuro
Currency 	100 pfennige = 1 Reichsmark

Refer 	German Colonies

Martinique 

Dates 	1886 – 1947
Capital 	Fort-de-France
Currency 	100 centimes = 1 franc

Main Article Needed

Mauritania 

Dates 	1960 –
Capital 	Nouakchott
Currency 	(1960) 100 centimes = 1 franc
		(1973) 100 cents = 1 ouguiya (um)

Main Article Needed 

Includes 	Mauritania (French Colony)

See also 	French West Africa

Mauritania (French Colony) 

Dates 	1906 – 1944
Capital 	Port Etienne
Currency 	100 centimes = 1 franc

Refer 	Mauritania

Mauritius 

Dates 	1847 –
Capital 	Port Louis
Currency 	(1847) 12 pence = 1 shilling; 20 shillings = 1 pound
		(1878) 100 cents = 1 rupee

Main Article Needed

Mayotte 

Dates 	1892 – 1914
Capital 	Dzaoudzi
Currency 	100 centimes = 1 franc (French)

Refer 	Madagascar & Dependencies

Main article 
Postage stamps and postal history of Mayotte

References

Bibliography
 Stanley Gibbons Ltd, Europe and Colonies 1970, Stanley Gibbons Ltd, 1969
 Stanley Gibbons Ltd, various catalogues
 Stuart Rossiter & John Flower, The Stamp Atlas, W H Smith, 1989
 XLCR Stamp Finder and Collector's Dictionary, Thomas Cliffe Ltd, c.1960

External links
 AskPhil – Glossary of Stamp Collecting Terms
 Encyclopaedia of Postal History

Ma